Dogs is a 2018 American documentary television series which premiered on Netflix. The series, created by Glen Zipper, was released on November 16, 2018.

The first season contains six episodes, roughly 50 minutes apiece. Each episode examines a facet of life in which dogs and humans interconnect, showcasing the relationship between dogs and humans for different countries, cultures and people.

In June 2019 it was announced that the show would return for a second season. The second season was released on July 7, 2021.

Premise
Dogs primarily explores the bond between dogs and humans throughout the world.

Episodes

Season 1 (2018)

Season 2 (2021)

Reception 
The series has received positive reviews from critics. On Rotten Tomatoes, the series' first season has a 92% approval rating with an average score of 9.17 out of 10 based on 12 critic reviews. The site's critical consensus states, "Dogs is a kindhearted series that offers viewers a glimpse of several extraordinary canines and the people they orbit, resulting in a hopeful celebration of humanity and its best friend." Laura Bradley of Vanity Fair stated that "its primary draw is its earnest storytelling—never manipulative, never syrupy. Yes, there’s fluff on the surface—but at its core, Dogs is good."

References

External links 

  on Netflix
 

Netflix original documentary television series
2018 American television series debuts
2021 American television series endings
2010s American documentary television series
English-language Netflix original programming
Television shows about dogs